Powder, Copper and Coal were the official mascots of the 2002 Winter Olympics and Otto was the official mascot of the 2002 Winter Paralympics, both held in Salt Lake City, United States.

Design history
The design process for the mascots began in September 1997, and after prototypes were created, the International Olympic Committee (IOC) approved the mascots in December 1998. The Salt Lake Organizing Committee (SLOC) worked with Landor Associates of San Francisco, California, and Publicis to design and market the mascots. The original illustrator of the mascots was Steve Small, known for his work in Rugrats and Disney's Hercules. For the 2002 Winter Paralympic Games, SLOC subsequently requested Small, Landor and Publicis for the creation of a new mascot along the creative lines of Powder, Copper and Coal. They created "Otto", an otter that is to convey the agility and vitality of the athletes.

Unveiling
All three mascots were publicly unveiled during a celebration on May 15, 1999, at the Triad Center in downtown Salt Lake City. This celebration was hosted by Olympian Kristi Yamaguchi and also celebrated 1,000 remaining days until the start of the 2002 games. The mascots were unveiled during the ceremony as actor and American Indian Billy Daydodge narrated the mascots' stories (which are based on legends from American Indian traditions).

On September 25, 1999, the names of the mascots were announced during a BYU Football game, in Provo, Utah (prior to this only the type of animals and their legends were known). Utah schoolchildren had originally suggested names for the mascots, and the top picks were then publicly voted on; the first in Olympic history.

Meaning and legends

The mascots are indigenous animals of the Western U.S., and are named after natural resources (except for Otto) which have long been important to Utah's economy, survival, and culture. All four animals are major characters in the legends of local American Indians, and each mascot (except for Otto) wears a charm around its neck with an original Anasazi or Fremont-style petroglyph to remind them of their heritage.

Notes

2002 Winter Olympics
2002 Winter Paralympics
Bear mascots
Fictional coyotes
Fictional rabbits and hares
Fictional otters
Olympic mascots
Paralympic mascots
Sports mascots in the United States
Fictional characters from Utah